Corematodus is a small genus of haplochromine cichlids native to the Lake Malawi basin in Africa. They feed on scales and fins of other cichlids.

Species
There are currently two recognized species in this genus:
 Corematodus shiranus Boulenger, 1897
 Corematodus taeniatus Trewavas, 1935

References

 
Haplochromini

Cichlid genera
Taxa named by George Albert Boulenger